Season 2006–07 was Airdrie United's fifth competitive season. They competed in the First Division, Challenge Cup, League Cup and the Scottish Cup.

Summary
Airdrie United finished ninth in the First Division, entering the play-offs losing 5-4 to Stirling Albion on aggregate and were relegated to the Second Division. They reached the third round of the Scottish Cup, the second round of the League Cup and were eliminated in the first round of the Challenge Cup.

Manager's
Airdrie started the season under the stewardship of Sandy Stewart who on 13 November 2006 was sacked by the club. Stewart was replaced by Kenny Black on 17 November.

League table

Results and fixtures

First Division

First Division play-offs

Challenge Cup

League Cup

Scottish Cup

Player statistics

Squad 

|}

a.  Includes other competitive competitions, including playoffs and the Scottish Challenge Cup.

References

Airdrieonians F.C. seasons
Airdrie United